Paulina Paluch (born 3 December 1998) is a Polish athlete. She competed in the women's 4 × 100 metres relay event at the 2020 Summer Olympics.

References

External links
 

1998 births
Living people
Polish female sprinters
Athletes (track and field) at the 2020 Summer Olympics
Olympic athletes of Poland
Place of birth missing (living people)